The Polo Park Mall is a shopping mall in central Enugu, in Enugu State, Nigeria.

The mall was opened by the Persianas Group and the Enugu State Government on September 15, 2011.

External links
 Polo Park Mall website

References

Enugu
Shopping malls in Nigeria
Buildings and structures in Enugu State
Shopping malls established in 2011
2011 establishments in Nigeria
21st-century architecture in Nigeria